Gary O'Brien is an Irish Gaelic footballer. He plays at senior level for the Meath county team.

References

Year of birth missing (living people)
Living people
Gaelic football backs
Meath inter-county Gaelic footballers
Navan O'Mahoneys Gaelic footballers